Women's javelin throw events for wheelchair athletes were held at the 2004 Summer Paralympics in the Athens Olympic Stadium. Events were held in three disability classes, F52/53 being held jointly with F33/34 cerebral palsy athletes.

F33/34/52/53

F54/55

The F54/55 event was won by Zanele Situ, representing .

26 Sept. 2004, 19:30

F56-58

The F56-58 event was won by Sofia Djelal, representing .

27 Sept. 2004, 09:00

References

W
2004 in women's athletics